Peggy Yu or Yu Yu (born 1965) is a Chinese businesswoman. She is the co-founder and chairwoman of dangdang.com, the largest online book retailer in China.

Early life 
Yu was born in Chongqing, China in 1965. She graduated from Beijing Foreign Studies University and began working as an interpreter and secretary for a general manager of the boiler supplier Babcock & Wilcox Beijing Company Ltd (B&WBC). In 1987, she went to the United States to continue her studies, and in 1992 she earned an MBA from New York University, where she gave the commencement speech on behalf of her classmates. Yu went to work on Wall Street, and lived in the United States for ten years. In 1996, she met Li Guoqing, a book publisher. They married after dating for three months.

Career 
In 1999, Yu and her husband launched an online bookstore, Dangdang. Yu is the chairwoman of the company. She had the idea for the company during her stay in the United States, when studying the establishment and development of Amazon.com since early 1995 when she was working on Wall Street. When she met her husband, they decided to start a similar online company in China. Since the company's creation in 1999, Dangdang has expanded to become an online bookstore with over 6,000,000 books, as well as home goods, clothing, jewelry, cosmetics, DVDs, and movies.

On July 9, 2015, almost five years after Dangdang went public on the New York Stock Exchange, Yu proposed to buy out the company from shareholders at a valuation of $630 million, less than half of Dangdang's IPO valuation. The proposed buyout price, $7.81 per ADS, was the lowest among all Chinese ADRs seeking to go private, 20% lower than the company's prior 30 days average trading price, according to Bloomberg.

Dangdang shareholders protested the proposed offer and launched a shareholder activism website, dangdangfacts.com, which asserted that Yu had unfairly taken advantage of minority shareholders.

References

External links 
 dangdang.com

1965 births
20th-century Chinese businesswomen
20th-century Chinese businesspeople
21st-century Chinese businesswomen
21st-century Chinese businesspeople
Beijing Foreign Studies University alumni
Businesspeople from Chongqing
Businesspeople in online retailing
Chinese computer businesspeople
Chinese expatriates in the United States
Chinese online retailer founders
Chinese women chief executives
Chinese women company founders
Living people
New York University Stern School of Business alumni